is a Japanese former sports shooter. He competed at the 1960 Summer Olympics and the 1964 Summer Olympics.

References

1931 births
Living people
Japanese male sport shooters
Olympic shooters of Japan
Shooters at the 1960 Summer Olympics
Shooters at the 1964 Summer Olympics
Sportspeople from Fukui Prefecture
20th-century Japanese people